Baie de la Dauphine is a natural harbour located on the Loranchet Peninsula, at the north-west of the island of Grande Terre in the Kerguelen Islands.

Geography 
The bay is located North of the Kerguelen, and opens towards the East, between the cape of the Kergelen Arch which limits its Northern extension and distinguishes it from Baie de l'Oiseau, and Discovery Presque-isle. The  Mont Havergal dominates the site on the North.

Discovery 
Lieutenant Kerguelen sighted the site during his first voyage in February 1772, without landing. In his second voyage, he arrived at the island in December 1773, and entered baie de l'Oiseau in January 1774. Surveying the site, he named Baie de la Dauphine in honour of the corvette Dauphine, which was part of the expedition, under Ferron du Quengo. The site has also been called "Bay of the Portal", in reference to the Kerguelen Arch, on some older military maps.

References 

Bays of France